Charles Elie Roger Masson (born 13 April 1992) is a field hockey player from France.

Career

Club level
In club competition, Masson plays for Gantoise in the Belgian Hockey League.

Under–21
Charles Masson debuted for the France U–21 team in 2012 at the EuroHockey Junior Championship in 's-Hertogenbosch.

The following year he went on to represent the team at the FIH Junior World Cup in New Delhi. At the tournament he won a silver medal, a history making performance for the French team.

Senior national team
Masson made his debut for the French national team in 2014.

Since his debut, Masson has been a regular fixture in the national squad. He won his first major medal with the senior team in 2019 at the FIH Series Finals in Le Touquet, taking home a gold medal.

References

External links
 
 

1992 births
Living people
French male field hockey players
Male field hockey midfielders
2018 Men's Hockey World Cup players
2023 Men's FIH Hockey World Cup players